The Roemer model of political competition is a game between political parties in which each party announces a multidimensional policy vector.  Since Nash equilibria do not normally exist when the policy space is multidimensional, John Roemer introduced the concept of party-unanimity Nash equilibrium (PUNE), which can be considered a generalization of the concept of Nash equilibrium in models of political competition.  It is also a generalization of the Wittman model of political competition.

In Roemer's model, all political parties are assumed to consist of three types of factions—opportunists, militants, and reformers.  Opportunists seek solely to maximize the party's vote share in an election; militants seek to announce (and implement) the preferred policy of the average party member; and reformers have an objective function that is a convex combination of the objective functions of the opportunists and militants.  It has been shown that the existence of reformers has no effect on what policies the party announces.

With two parties, a pair of policy announcements constitute a PUNE if and only if the reformers and militants of any given party do not unanimously agree to deviate from their announced policy, given the policy put forth by the other party.  In other words, if a pair of policies constitute a PUNE, then it should not be the case that both factions of a party can be made weakly better off (and one faction strictly better off) by deviating from the policy that they put forward. Such unanimity to deviate can be rare, and thus PUNEs are more likely to exist than regular Nash equilibria.

Although there are no known cases where PUNEs do not exist, no simple necessary and sufficient conditions for the existence of non-trivial PUNEs have yet been offered.  (A nontrivial PUNE is one in which no party offers the ideal policy of either its militants or opportunists.) The question of the existence of non-trivial PUNEs remains an important open question in the theory of political competition.

References
 John E. Roemer, Political Competition: Theory and Applications (2001) Cambridge, MA: Harvard University Press.

Political theories
Game theory